Alla Ivanovna Vazhenina (born May 29, 1983) is a Russian weightlifter competing for Kazakhstan.

She was born in Shadrinsk, Kurgan Oblast. When she was not selected for the Russian national team, she decided to compete for Kazakhstan.

She won the silver medal in the 75 kg category at the 2008 Asian Weightlifting Championships, with a total of 266 kg.

At the 2008 Summer Olympics she won the silver medal in the 75 kg category, again with a total of 266 kg.

Recipient of the Order of Parasat.

Notes and references

External links
 Athlete Biography at beijing2008

People from Shadrinsk
Living people
1983 births
Recipients of the Order of Parasat
Russian female weightlifters
Kazakhstani female weightlifters
Olympic weightlifters of Kazakhstan
Weightlifters at the 2008 Summer Olympics
Olympic gold medalists for Kazakhstan
Olympic medalists in weightlifting
Medalists at the 2008 Summer Olympics
Sportspeople from Kurgan Oblast